Paranga is a town in Gulu District, in Northern Uganda.

Location
Paranga is bordered by Barogal to the north, Ongwam to the northeast, Moru to the east, Ngai to the southeast, Bobi to the south and Ongoko to the west. The coordinates of the town are:02 34 32N, 32 21 25E (Latitude:2.257556; Longitude:32.35695).

Landmarks
The landmarks within the town limits or close to the edges of the town include:

 The junction of the Gulu-Masindi Highway with the Gulu-Lira Highway
 The offices of Paranga Town Council
 Paranga Central Market

See also
Gulu
Gulu District
Acholi sub-region
Acholi people
Northern Region, Uganda

References

Populated places in Northern Region, Uganda
Cities in the Great Rift Valley
Gulu District